The 1988–89 Duleep Trophy was the 28th season of the Duleep Trophy, a first-class cricket tournament contested by five zonal teams of India: Central Zone, East Zone, North Zone, South Zone and West Zone.

The title was shared by North Zone and West Zone.

Results

Final

References

External links
Series home at CricketArchive

Duleep Trophy seasons
Duleep Trophy
Duleep Trophy